USS Detector (AM-429/MSO-429) was an  built for the United States Navy.

The second ship to be named Detector by the Navy, AM-429 was launched 5 December 1952 by Astoria Marine Construction Co., Astoria, Oregon; sponsored by Mrs. W. Norblad; and commissioned 26 January 1954. She was reclassified MSO-429, 7 February 1955.

East Coast operations 

Detector sailed from San Diego, California, 18 October 1954 to join Mine Force, Atlantic Fleet, and arrived at Charleston, South Carolina, 8 November. Along with her operations in the local area and off Florida on mine exercises, she served tours of duty with the U.S. 6th Fleet in the Mediterranean in 1956, 1957, and 1959. She cruised to northern Europe between 12 May and 30 September 1958 and through 1962 took part in training and amphibious exercises.

Final status 

Detector was decommissioned on 1 October 1982 and struck from the Naval Vessel Register on 1 December 1983.  She was scrapped in 1984.

References

External links 
 NavSource Online: Mine Warfare Vessel Photo Archive - Detector (MSO-429) - ex-AM-429

 

Agile-class minesweepers
Vietnam War ships
Ships built in Astoria, Oregon
1952 ships
Cold War minesweepers of the United States